Martina Schröter (born 16 November 1960) is a German rower, who competed for the SG Dynamo Potsdam / Sportvereinigung (SV) Dynamo. She won the medals at the international rowing competitions. In October 1986, she was awarded a Patriotic Order of Merit in gold (first class) for her sporting success. The Olympic gold medal that she won in 1988 in the double sculls teamed up with Birgit Peter was the 500th Olympic medal won by East Germany.

References 

1960 births
Living people
Sportspeople from Weimar
People from Bezirk Erfurt
East German female rowers
Olympic rowers of East Germany
Rowers at the 1980 Summer Olympics
Rowers at the 1988 Summer Olympics
Olympic medalists in rowing
Olympic gold medalists for East Germany
World Rowing Championships medalists for East Germany
Medalists at the 1988 Summer Olympics
Medalists at the 1980 Summer Olympics
Recipients of the Patriotic Order of Merit in gold
Olympic bronze medalists for East Germany